Peter John Garland (born 20 January 1971) is an English former professional footballer who played for Tottenham Hotspur, Newcastle United, Charlton Athletic, Wycombe Wanderers, Leyton Orient and represented England at youth level.

Career
Garland began his career at Tottenham Hotspur as a youth trainee in July 1989. The midfielder made one substitute appearance for Spurs in July 1991 against Norwich City. Newcastle United manager Kevin Keegan paid £35,000 for Garland in March 1992. He went on to feature in two matches. He transferred to Charlton Athletic and notched up a further 53 appearances and netting twice between 1992–95. Garland joined Wycombe Wanderers on loan before joining Leyton Orient in July 1996. After leaving Brisbane Road he played for several non-league clubs including Crawley Town, Whyteleafe, Dulwich Hamlet, Greenwich Borough and Erith Town. He was appointed caretaker player manager of Greenwich in 2006, but was sacked later in the year.

References

External links

1971 births
Living people
Footballers from Croydon
English footballers
English Football League players
Tottenham Hotspur F.C. players
Newcastle United F.C. players
Charlton Athletic F.C. players
Wycombe Wanderers F.C. players
Leyton Orient F.C. players
Crawley Town F.C. players
Whyteleafe F.C. players
Dulwich Hamlet F.C. players
Greenwich Borough F.C. players
Erith Town F.C. players
English football managers
Greenwich Borough F.C. managers
Association football midfielders